Wanaaring is a remote outback village in north western New South Wales, Australia. Situated on the Paroo River, some 980 kilometres from Sydney, and 180 km west of Bourke.

Wanaaring is on the "Cut Line" road between the town of Bourke, and the desert village of Tibooburra. Long distance travellers often stop at Wanaaring for meals or to refuel.

Wanaaring is in outback Australia, in remote agricultural country. The grazing lands support cattle, sheep and goats. Honey is also produced. An all-weather air strip is located east of the village centre.

Activities 
Fishing and bush camping by the Paroo River. There is an annual gymkhana and rodeo, which supports the Royal Flying Doctor Service. The Flying Doctor provides essential medical aid to outback communities such as Wanaaring.

History
Wanaaring is in the traditional lands of the Paaruntyi people and The Burke and Wills expedition were the first Europeans to the area.

Climate 
The climate is semi-arid, featuring low rainfall, very hot summer temperatures and cool nights in winter. Wanaaring holds the Australian record for the highest minimum temperature, 36.6 °C recorded on 26 January 2019. A minimum temperature of -3.9 °C was recorded in July 1997.

References 

 http://wiserivers.nationalparks.nsw.gov.au/Multimedia/vBlob.jsp?lvl1=3&lvl2=1&lvl3=4&lvl4=9&lvl5=5

Bourke Shire
Towns in New South Wales